Željko Kerum (born 25 September 1960) is a Croatian entrepreneur and politician who served as Mayor of Split from 2009 to 2013. He also owned the supermarket chain Kerum until it folded in 2012.

He won the election in 2009 and became the mayor, but failed to qualify for the second round of the election in 2013. In the 2017 election, Andro Krstulović Opara from the HDZ defeated him in the second round of voting.

Early life 
Kerum was born in the village of Ogorje (part of Muć) in the Dalmatian hinterland. He graduated from the Technical High School in Split in 1978. In 1981 he got his first job in the Split construction company Melioracija, spending a year in Iraq working on military bases.

Business career 
He founded the company Kerum in 1989, opening his first convenience store in 1990. Six years later he opened his first supermarket in the Lora neighbourhood of Split. In 2003 he bought the Diokom industrial facilities (ex-Jugoplastika), and in 2007 he opened the Joker shopping mall, the largest in Dalmatia at the time.

Politics 
In the first round of the 2009 elections for Mayor of Split, Kerum as an independent candidate won 40.21% of the popular vote, while his closest rival Ranko Ostojić (SDP) won 34.72%. On 31 May, he won 58.42% of the vote, making him the incumbent mayor of Split.

In September 2009, during a live television interview on the Nedjeljom u 2 talk show that airs on the Croatian state broadcaster HRT 1, in response to host Aleksandar Stanković's question if Serb businessmen are welcome in Croatia, Kerum answered: "If it was up to me I would not let them because Serbs never brought us anything good in the past and they will not do it now. Not only Serbs, but also Montenegrins. And whoever is doing business with them will not make out OK". Asked further by Stanković if he would accept a man of Serb ethnicity as a son-in-law, Kerum answered emphatically: "No, never".

On 16 January 2011, the citizens of Split, on the initiative of an informal group of citizens gathered on Facebook, protested at the Prva Voda beach on the Marjan park mountain in Split against a change of city urban planning regulation that allowed construction of restaurants and bars in the beach area. According to plans, on the proposed beach site a company owned by his mistress Fani Horvat planned to build such an object, with the destruction of protected wood area. The idea was perceived as a nepotistic venture and favouring of Kerum's own interests instead of the city's. Kerum also caused a stir in Split when he proposed to build a 40 meter tall statue of Christ the Redeemer to rival that of Brazil.

In 2011, he became a candidate in the 2011 Croatian parliamentary election on the electoral list of the Croatian Democratic Union.

In the 2013 Croatian local elections Kerum won only 18.57% of the popular vote while re-running for mayor, which did not qualify him to the second round of the election. Also, Kerum's Croatian Civic Party won only 12.41% of the popular votes for the city council of Split.

In the 2015 Croatian parliamentary election, his party won only 2,234 votes in the two Dalmatian constituencies and became a non-parliamentary party.

Personal life 
In 1989, Kerum married his wife Anka Lalin, with whom he has a daughter and son. In 2009, he surprised the public by publicly announcing he was divorcing his wife to be with his pregnant mistress Fani Horvat, who was nearly 25 years his junior. The news caused many in the media to point out the hypocrisy in his political image, where he has consistently presented himself as a supporter of traditional values and a conservative world view, but had been participating in an extramarital affair.

Kerum has been known to own expensive cars including a Hummer, a Mercedes S500, a BMW 7, a Maybach 62, a Ferrari F430, and a Ferrari 599 GTB Fiorano. His Cessna Citation X, a business jet worth approximately $17 million, is the most expensive privately owned aircraft in Croatia.

References 

1960 births
Living people
People from Muć
Croatian businesspeople
Mayors of Split, Croatia
Representatives in the modern Croatian Parliament